The Disorderly Orderly is a 1964 American comedy film released by Paramount Pictures, and starring Jerry Lewis. The film was produced by Paul Jones with a screenplay by director Frank Tashlin, based on a story by Norm Liebermann and Ed Haas.

Plot
Jerome Littlefield is an orderly at a hospital.  His dream is to be a doctor, but he has a problem that prevents it from becoming a reality: when he hears of a problem that a patient is having, psychosomatically he begins to suffer those symptoms as well.

Susan Andrews, an old high school friend, is brought to the hospital after a suicide attempt.  Littlefield recognizes her as the girl he has had a crush on since then. Eventually Andrews falls for Littlefield and they kiss. Littlefield later realizes that his problem with suffering from other people's symptoms was a direct result of his obsession with Andrews.  Now that he has overcome that, his problems go away and he finally becomes a doctor.

Cast
 Jerry Lewis as Jerome Littlefield
 Susan Oliver as Susan
 Kathleen Freeman as Nurse Higgins
 Glenda Farrell as Dr. Howard
 Karen Sharpe as Julie
 Alice Pearce as Mrs. Fuzzibee 
 Barbara Nichols as Patient
 Jack E. Leonard as Patient
 Everett Sloane as Mr. Tuffington

Production
The Disorderly Orderly was filmed at the Greystone Park and Mansion in Beverly Hills, California with costumes designed by Edith Head and its title song rendered by Sammy Davis, Jr.

Soundtrack
The title song, sung over the opening credits, is performed by Sammy Davis, Jr. The title song "The Disorderly Orderly" was written by songwriter Earl Shuman.

Reception
While Howard Thompson of the New York Times (December 24, 1964) liked a few comedic bits and praised some secondary performers, he generally panned The Disorderly Orderly writing, "[The film] runs dry at the end of the first third — like a juiceless watermelon — and splits open, with about the same results."

On Rotten Tomatoes, the film holds a 60% rating based on 5 reviews, with an average rating of 5.95/10.

Home media
The film was released to Region 1 DVD on October 12, 2004 and March 15, 2021.

See also
List of American films of 1964

References

External links 
 

1964 comedy films
1964 films
American comedy films
1960s English-language films
Films directed by Frank Tashlin
Films set in hospitals
Paramount Pictures films
Films with screenplays by Frank Tashlin
1960s American films